John XIII may refer to:

 Pope John XIII, (r. 965–972)
 John XIII of Constantinople, Ecumenical Patriarch (r. 1315–1320)
 John XIII bar Ma'dani, Syriac Orthodox Patriarch of Antioch (r. 1483–1493)
 Pope John XIII of Alexandria, Coptic Orthodox Patriarch of Alexandria (r. 1483-1524)